Reports of Cases at Nisi Prius, in the Queen's Bench, Common Pleas, and Exchequer, together with Cases tried in the Central Criminal Court, and on the Circuit, from Michaelmas Term, 1823, to Easter Term, 1841 is the title of a collection of nominate reports by F A Carrington and J Payne, of cases decided between approximately 1823 and 1841. They were published in nine royal octavo volumes from 1825 to 1841, by S Sweet.

They are also known as Carrington and Payne's Reports. For the purpose of citation, their name may be abbreviated to "C & P" or "Car & P".

Volume 1 of Carrington and Payne's Reports is reprinted in volume 171 of the English Reports. Volumes 2 to 6 of Carrington and Payne's Reports are reprinted in volume 172 of the English Reports. Volumes 7 to 9 of Carrington and Payne's Reports are reprinted in volume 173 of the English Reports.

In 1847, J G Marvin said:

The Carrington and Payne's Reports reported the case of Joel v Morison.

References
Carrington and Payne. Reports of Cases argued and ruled at Nisi Prius, in the Courts of King's Bench and Common Pleas, and on the Circuit; from the Sittings in Michaelmas Term, 1823, to the Sittings after Hilary Term, 1825. S Sweet. London. 1825. Volume I. Digitized copy from Google Books.
Carrington and Payne. Reports of Cases argued and ruled at Nisi Prius, in the Courts of King's Bench and Common Pleas, and on the Circuit; from the Sittings in Easter Term, 1825, to the Sittings in Trinity Term, 1827. S Sweet. London. 1827. Volume II. Digitized copy from Google Books.
Carrington and Payne. Reports of Cases argued and ruled at Nisi Prius, in the Courts of King's Bench and Common Pleas, and on the Circuit; From the Sittings after Trinity Term, 1827, to the Sittings after Easter Term, 1829. Volume III. S Sweet. London. R Milliken & Son. Dublin. 1829. Digitized copy from Google Books.
Carrington and Payne. Reports of Cases argued and ruled at Nisi Prius, in the Courts of King's Bench, Common Pleas, & Exchequer; together with Cases tried on the Circuits & at the Old Bailey; from the Sittings after Trinity Term, 1831, to the Sittings after Hilary Term, 1833. Volume V. S Sweet. London. R Miliken and Son. 1833. Digitized copy from Google Books.
Volume VI. Snippet view from Google Books.
Carrington and Payne. Reports of Cases argued and ruled at Nisi Prius, in the Courts of King's Bench, Common Pleas, & Exchequer; together with Cases tried on the Circuits, and in the Central Criminal Court: From Hilary Term, 5 Will. IV., to Easter Term, 7 Will. IV. Volume VII. S Sweet. London. R Milliken & Son. Dublin. 1837. Digitized copy from Google Books.
Carrington and Payne. Reports of Cases argued and ruled at Nisi Prius, in the Courts of King's Bench, Common Pleas, & Exchequer; together with Cases tried on the Circuits, and in the Central Criminal Court: From Hilary Term, 7 Will. IV., to Easter Term, 2 Vict. Volume VIII. S Sweet. London. R Milliken and Son. Dublin. 1839. Digitized copy from Google Books.
Carrington and Payne. Reports of Cases argued and ruled at Nisi Prius, in the Courts of King's Bench, Common Pleas, & Exchequer; together with Cases tried on the Circuits, and in the Central Criminal Court: From Easter Term, 2 Vict., to Easter Term, 4 Vict. S Sweet. London. A Milliken. Dublin. 1841. Digitized copy from Google Books.

Sets of reports reprinted in the English Reports